Thrust is the fourteenth studio album by American jazz-funk musician Herbie Hancock, released in September 1974 on Columbia Records. The album reached No. 2 on the Billboard Top Soul Albums chart and No. 13 on the Billboard 200 chart. It is the second album featuring The Headhunters: saxophonist Bennie Maupin, bass guitarist Paul Jackson, drummer Mike Clark (replacing Harvey Mason in this role) and percussionist Bill Summers.

Background
Thrust was produced by David Rubinson and Herbie Hancock.

Covers
"Actual Proof" was covered by the Peter Zak Trio (2006) and Roberta Piket (2015). 

The composition "Butterfly" was subsequently performed by Hancock himself in his live album Flood (1975), in two studio albums of Direct Step (1979) and Dis Is da Drum (1994), and in Kimiko Kasai's album Butterfly (1979).
"Butterfly" was also covered by Norman Connors (1978), Eddie Henderson (1978), Toto (2002), Austin Peralta (2006), Azymuth (2008) and the Robert Glasper Experiment (2009).

"Spank-a-Lee" was covered by Mitchel Forman (2001).

In popular culture
A variation of the composition "Palm Grease" was used in the 1974 vigilante film Death Wish, starring Charles Bronson.

The composition "Actual Proof" was originally written for the 1973 film The Spook Who Sat by the Door, and Hancock has used it as a demonstration of his style of playing the Fender Rhodes piano.

Track listing
All compositions by Herbie Hancock except as indicated

Personnel
Herbie Hancock – Fender Rhodes electric piano, Hohner D6 clavinet, ARP Odyssey, ARP Soloist, ARP 2600, ARP String Ensemble
Bennie Maupin – tenor saxophone, soprano saxophone, saxello, bass clarinet, alto flute
Paul Jackson – electric bass
Mike Clark – drums
Bill Summers - percussion

References

Herbie Hancock albums
1974 albums
Columbia Records albums
Jazz-funk albums
Albums produced by Dave Rubinson
Albums recorded at Wally Heider Studios